Marble Peak may refer to:

 Marble Peak (Antarctica)
 Marble Peak (British Columbia)